Joseph R. Blasi is an American economic sociologist, currently a Distinguished Professor and the J. Robert Beyster Professor at Rutgers School of Management and Labor Relations.  He graduated with an Ed.D. from Harvard University.

Publications
Books by Blasi include:
The Citizen's Share: Reducing Inequality in the 21st Century (Yale University Press, 2013, with Richard Freeman and Douglas Kruse)
Shared Capitalism at Work (University of Chicago Press, 2010, with Douglas Kruse and Richard Freeman)
In The Company of Owners (Basic Books, 2003, with Douglas Kruse and Aaron Bernstein)
The New Owners (HarperCollins, 1991, with Douglas Kruse)
Employee Ownership (Harper and Row, 1988)
A Working Nation (Russell Sage Foundation, 2000, with various co-authors)

References

Year of birth missing (living people)
Living people
Rutgers University faculty
American economists
Harvard Graduate School of Education alumni